Gilmário Pinto Vemba (born 19 June 1985), popularly as Gilmário Vemba, is an Angolan actor and comedian. He is best known for the roles in the television serials O Bar do Gilmário, After Party and Fora de Série. He was a former member of the comedy group "os Tuneza".

Personal life
He was born on 19 July 1985 in Luanda, Angola. He graduated in International Relations and Political Analysis.

He is married and is a father of three girls and one boy.

Career
In 2003, Vemba along with Daniel Vilola, Orlando Rodrigues, Cesalty Paulo and José Chieta formed the comedy group os Tuneza. He continued in the group for over 15 years, until left the group in 2020. In 2019, he presented comedy show in Portugal with the title "Imortal".

In 2021, he made his film debut with A Dívida (The Debt) directed by Anacleto de Abreu. The film was premiered on the 26th February 2021 at Cinemax, in Luanda. In July 2021, he signed with TVI's new reality show O Amor Acontece.

Since 2022, he is one of the permanent contestants of the Portuguese edition of "Taskmaster" (RTP1).

Filmography

References

External links
 

Living people
1966 births
Angolan actors